Alma's Not Normal is a British sitcom first broadcast as a pilot episode on BBC Two in April 2020. The series follows the eponymous Alma, from Bolton, as she tries to give her life meaning and the "fabulous" outcome she has always dreamed of, while coping with the strained relationships of her family that saw her spend time in care, something else which she is trying to reconcile. The series is written by and stars Sophie Willan and is inspired by her own experiences of the care system.

Willan won the 2021 BAFTA Television award for best comedy writer for the pilot episode. A full six episode series was commissioned for broadcast in 2021. A second series was commissioned in 2022.

Background
Willan wrote the first draft around 2014 on the back of the austerity measures of the Cameron Government, that Willan says "felt really negative for welfare recipients, mental health [care] and social services recipients – people like my mother, people who’ve had difficulties." Willan won the BBC's Caroline Aherne Bursary in 2017 which awarded her £5000 to develop her ideas along with mentorship from the BBC's Comedy Commissioning Editor, Kate Daughton, to develop a script. The script was performed as a rehearsed reading in front of an invited audience including Controller of BBC Two, Patrick Holland. Willan was given a commission for a pilot on the spot. Wilan wrote the script for the first series of the show during the COVID-19 pandemic.

Cast and characters
Sophie Willan as Alma Nuthall –  Alma is a working-class aspiring actress in her thirties who has recently been through a break-up. She spent some of her childhood in care and works as an escort, having left school without qualifications.
Jayde Adams as Leanne, Alma's best friend.
Siobhan Finneran as Lin Nuthall – Alma's mother Lin struggles with mental health issues and a heroin addiction that meant she was unable to look after Alma during childhood, and she has a troubled relationship with Alma in adulthood.
Lorraine Ashbourne as Joan Nuthall – Joan is Lin's mother and Alma's grandmother. She raised Alma as a child when Lin was unable to. Alma regularly visits Joan as an adult.
James Baxter as Anthony, Alma's ex-boyfriend.
Maizie Wickson as Young Alma
Nicholas Asbury as Jim
Dave Johns as Bill
Katie Redford as Jane
Dave Spikey as Ian, a drama teacher
Sue Vincent as Trish

Episodes

Pilot (2020)

Series 1 (2021)
Episode one is the pilot episode, renamed as Feng Suey.

Reception
In her four star review of the pilot episode broadcast in 2020, Lucy Mangan in The Guardian praised the fine cast and the "swiftly and surely drawn characters" and commented on the episode's "emotional undertow, that, with perfect timing, surfaces to punch the viewer in the stomach and leave them breathless with sorrow". The episode was summed up as a bleak, brilliant comedy that was far from ordinary.
Writing in Chortle, Steve Bennett praised the episode for the way that it introduced "a cast of intriguing, sympathetic characters we’d like to hear more from" praising them for being "complex, authentic people portrayed in a way we don’t usually see on television". He praised the "universally strong performances" of the cast and the humanity of the characters bringing lightness to what could have been a bleak set of subject matter.

The Daily Mirror's Ian Hyland called it ‘Phoenix Nights meets Fleabag, guided by the spirit of Victoria Wood’ adding that the pilot convinced him "that BBC2 has a massive gem on its hands". 

Ben Dowell of The Times said, ‘Willan's writing is skilled and clearly very personal...uplifting and strangely enchanting’.

Awards

In April 2021, Willan won the Comedy Writer BAFTA for the pilot episode. The 2021 series won the award for best comedy programme at the Royal Television Society North West Awards.

|-
! rowspan=2 scope="row" | 2021
| British Academy Television Craft Awards
| Best Writer: Comedy
| Sophie Willan
| 
| 
|-
|  Royal Television Society Awards
| Comedy Performance - Female
| Sophie Willan
| 
| 
|-
! rowspan=8 scope="row" | 2022
| Broadcast Awards
| Best Comedy Programme 
| Alma's Not Normal
| 
| 
|-
| rowspan="3" |British Academy Television Awards
| Best Female Comedy Performance
| Sophie Willan
| 
| 
|-
| Best Scripted Comedy
| Alma's Not Normal
| 
| 
|-
| Writer: Comedy
| Sophie Willan
| 
| 
|-
| Broadcasting Press Guild Awards
| Best Comedy
| Alma's Not Normal
| 
| 
|-
| rowspan="2" |Royal Television Society Awards
| Comedy Performance - Female
| Sophie Willan
| 
| 
|-
| Scripted Comedy
| Alma's Not Normal
| 
| 
|-
| Royal Television Society Craft & Design Awards 
| Director - Comedy Drama & Situation Comedy 
| Andrew Chaplin
| 
|

References

External links
 
 
 

2020 British television series debuts
2020s British sitcoms
BBC high definition shows
BBC television sitcoms
English-language television shows
Television shows set in Greater Manchester
BAFTA winners (television series)